The striolated manakin or western striped manakin (Machaeropterus striolatus) is a small South American species of passerine bird in the family Pipridae. It is found in west and north west Amazonia. The striolated manakin was formerly considered conspecific with the kinglet manakin (Machaeropterus regulus) with the common name "striped manakin". Males have a bright red crown, which the females lack.

Taxonomy
The striolated manakin was described by the French naturalist Charles Lucien Bonaparte in 1838 and given the binomial name Pipra striolata. The species is now placed in the genus Machaeropterus that was introduced by Bonaparte in 1854.

Five subspecies are recognised:

 Machaeropterus striolatus antioquiae Chapman, 1924 – west and central Colombia
 Machaeropterus striolatus striolatus (Bonaparte, 1838) – east Colombia, east Ecuador, east Peru and west Amazonian Brazil
 Machaeropterus striolatus obscurostriatus Phelps & Gilliard, 1941 – northwest Venezuela
 Machaeropterus striolatus zulianus Phelps & Phelps Jr, 1952 – west Venezuela
 Machaeropterus striolatus aureopectus Phelps & Gilliard, 1941 – southeast Venezuela and west Guyana

The morphologically similar painted manakin from northern Peru was described in 2017. It differs from the striolated manakin in its vocalization.

Description
The male of the nominate race is olive green above with a red crown and nape. The underparts are streaked redish and white. The throat is whitish. The female lacks the red crown.

References

Birds of Colombia
Birds of Venezuela
Birds of the Amazon Basin
Birds of the Ecuadorian Amazon
Birds of the Peruvian Amazon
Striolated manakin
striolated manakin
striolated manakin